Mehdy Metella (born 17 July 1992) is a French freestyle and butterfly swimmer. He was part of the freestyle and medley 4×100 m teams that won a gold and a silver medal at the 2014 European Aquatics Championships and gold and bronze at the 2015 World Championship. In both cases, he swam the butterfly leg in the medley relay.

He also won multiple medals in the World and European Short Course swimming events.

He is the French record holder of the 100m butterfly long course, with a time of 51.06. In the French swimming championships in Rennes he broke his own national record in the 100 m butterfly with a time of 50s85’’.

Personal life
He is the younger brother of Malia Metella, an Olympic and World championship medallist.

References

External links

1992 births
Living people
Sportspeople from Cayenne
French Guianan male swimmers
French male freestyle swimmers
Male butterfly swimmers
Olympic swimmers of France
Swimmers at the 2016 Summer Olympics
World Aquatics Championships medalists in swimming
Medalists at the FINA World Swimming Championships (25 m)
Swimmers at the 2010 Summer Youth Olympics
Olympic silver medalists for France
Medalists at the 2016 Summer Olympics
Olympic silver medalists in swimming
European Aquatics Championships medalists in swimming
Youth Olympic gold medalists for France
Swimmers at the 2020 Summer Olympics